Alison Lacey Otzelberger (born Alison Mavis Lacey; 26 December 1987) is an Australian-American basketball coach and former player. She played in the WNBA and was subsequently a collegiate women's basketball coach in the US at Marshalltown Community College in Iowa.

Lacey played at Iowa State from 2006 to 2010, where she became the highest drafted player in school history. She became the only player from ISU, and only the seventh in Big 12 history, to record 1500 points, 500 rebounds, and 500 assists. She became the second player in school history to record a triple-double. She also led the nation in assist-turnover ratio for most of the season, while finishing second at the end. She led Iowa State to four consecutive NCAA tournaments, which included an Elite 8 and a Sweet 16. She was on the All-Big 12 First Team, and was an All-American honorable mention.

Iowa State statistics

Source

Professional
Lacey watched the Seattle Storm win their second championship in 2010. She also played for the Canberra Capitals in the WNBL. She did not return to the WNBA for the 2011 season.

Coaching
Lacey was hired as head coach of the Marshalltown Community College women's basketball team in February 2012 after former coach Larry Roberts was released from his coaching duties. The Tigers finished the year with an 11–17 record. Lacey led the team to an 11–20 record in 2012–13, her only full season as head coach. She resigned effective 1 July 2013, after her then-fiancé T. J. Otzelberger accepted a coaching position with the men's basketball program at the University of Washington. Otzelberger is currently the head coach of the Iowa State Cyclones men's basketball. The two were married on 1 June 2013 in Milwaukee.

See also
 List of Australian WNBA players

References

Other references

External links
 
 
 Iowa State bio

1987 births
Living people
Australian expatriate basketball people in the United States
Australian women's basketball coaches
Australian women's basketball players
Canberra Capitals players
Iowa State Cyclones women's basketball players
Junior college women's basketball coaches in the United States
Seattle Storm draft picks
Seattle Storm players
Sportspeople from Canberra
Guards (basketball)
21st-century American women